Donald Howard Yarborough (December 15, 1925 – September 23, 2009) was an American liberal Democratic politician who was among the first in the U.S. South to endorse the Civil Rights Act of 1964. Yarborough, an attorney in Houston, Texas, ran for governor of Texas in 1962, 1964, and 1968. He was unrelated to another Texas liberal, Ralph Yarborough, who served as U.S. Senator from 1957-1971.

Background

Yarborough was born in New Orleans, Louisiana. His father was the president of a bank in New Orleans that went bust during the Great Depression; so Don was sent temporarily to spend part of his boyhood living with an aunt in Mississippi, where he picked cotton in the fields of his family's farm, along with the laborers. His father eventually got a job with the government and moved the family to Washington, D.C. His family also spent time during the years after the depression living with relatives in Coral Gables, Florida. The family eventually moved together to Houston when he was twelve years of age. His mother, Inez Black Yarborough, served as head of the Women in Yellow volunteer corps at the Jefferson Davis Hospital in Houston.

Upon graduating from San Jacinto High School at seventeen, he enlisted in the United States Marine Corps, entered officer's training school, and became a company commander at the age of nineteen. He served one year in China at the close of World War II. After the war, Yarborough enrolled at the University of Texas at Austin, at which he belonged to Kappa Alpha fraternity, and worked part-time to supplement the money he received under the G.I. Bill of Rights. He earned his law degree from the University of Texas School of Law in 1950. 

Shortly after earning his law degree, Yarborough re-entered the Marine Corps to serve during the Korean War as a member of the Judge Advocate General's Corps.  He then returned to Texas to establish his own law firm and take part in civic affairs. In 1956, as president of the Houston Junior Chamber International, Yarborough won the national debating championship for the organization because of his passionate speaking skills. In 1960, Yarborough married his first wife, Katherine Edwards.

Career

In 1962, he came close to winning the primary runoff election against John B. Connally, Jr., having polled 49 percent of the ballots. Other interparty rivals, considered conservatives, included the state attorney general, Will Wilson, highway commissioner Marshall Formby, and General Edwin A. Walker, who made anticommunism the centerpiece of his race. The Republican gubernatorial nominee, Jack Cox, an oil equipment executive from Houston, was also a strong conservative and a former Democratic member of the Texas House of Representatives.

Although Yarborough never became governor, his campaigns contributed strongly to the reform of the Texas Democratic Party, uniting, behind Yarborough's candidacy were New Deal loyalists, organized labor, African Americans, Mexican Americans, and reform-seeking liberals. His candidacy enabled this coalition to capture local constituencies in the Texas House and Senate and to build organizations later drawn upon by Mark White and Ann Richards.

In 1963, Yarborough was named by Life magazine as one of the 100 young Americans who were "distinguished by their dedication to something larger than private success, because they had the courage to act against old problems, the boldness to try out new ideas, and a hard-bitten, undaunted hopefulness about man."

In his first run for political office, Yarborough ran in 1960 for Texas lieutenant governor. In 1962, he ran for the first time for governor, and in a field of five Democratic candidates, he reached a run-off with John Connally and came within 28,000 votes of winning the nomination, a nationally noted near-upset in a state long dominated by the conservative faction of the Democratic Party. He ran for governor again in 1964 and 1968. In political life he supported civil rights, economic justice, environmental protection, and women's equality, and he challenged the business establishment that had long dominated Texas politics.

After leaving politics, Yarborough promoted science as a means to ease suffering and cure aging. He worked as a lobbyist for the Paraplegia Cure Research in Washington, D.C., where he lived for many years on Capitol Hill and in McLean, Virginia. He also played a role in the Council for a Livable World and was a founding member of biotech research companies.

Yarborough died of Parkinson's disease on September 23, 2009. He was married three times: to Katherine Edwards Yarborough in 1960, to Gail Lind in 1978, and Houston realtor Charity O'Connell Yarborough in 1984.

References

1925 births
2009 deaths
Politicians from New Orleans
Politicians from Houston
Military personnel from Texas
Texas Democrats
San Jacinto High School alumni
University of Texas at Austin alumni
University of Texas School of Law alumni
United States Marine Corps officers
United States Marine Corps personnel of World War II
United States Marine Corps personnel of the Korean War
Military personnel from Louisiana
Lawyers from New Orleans
Deaths from Parkinson's disease
Neurological disease deaths in Texas
20th-century American lawyers
20th-century American Episcopalians